Cape Fiolent, also historically called Cape Fiolente, is a cape and nature reserve (zakaznik) located in southern Sevastopol, a city within Crimea that is internationally recognised as part of Ukraine but currently occupied by Russia since 2014.

Description 
Made up of volcanic rock, Cape Fiolent was formed more than 150 million years ago from volcanic eruptions. Various minerals can be found in the Cape's rock.

Cape Fiolent has been noted for its beauty. In particular are its rock formations and picturesque, quiet beaches.

History 
During Roman times, Cape Fiolent was known under the name of Parthenium, in connection to Greek mythology. According to Greek mythology, Iphigenia was taken to an area in southern Crimea.

According to local legend, in 891 C.E., Byzantine sailors passing by Cape Fiolent encountered stormy seas and were saved by an apparition of Saint George appearing on what is now known as the Rock of the Holy Apparition. After the storm passed, the sailors discovered an icon and founded the Saint George monastery, additionally placing a cross on the Rock of the Holy Apparition. During the Middle Ages, Cape Fiolent was known as Saint George, after the monastery. The monastery was closed by the government of the Soviet Union, but later revived.

The name of Cape Fiolent descends from the Genoese colonisation of Crimea, when the cape was referred to as "violent" for its turbulent waves. In the 1800s, Joseph Needham painted multiple images of Cape Fiolent.

During the 2022 Russian invasion of Ukraine, Russian military bases on Cape Fiolent were attacked by Ukrainian forces.

References 

Headlands of Crimea
Headlands of Ukraine
Landforms of Sevastopol